Defending champion Dominic Inglot and his partner, Austin Krajicek, defeated Marcus Daniell and Wesley Koolhof in the final, 6–4, 4–6, [10–4], to win the men's doubles tennis title at the 2019 Rosmalen Grass Court Championships. It was the first time Inglot and Krajicek had competed as a team, and the victory earned Inglot his 12th career ATP Tour doubles title and Krajicek his second. Daniell and Koolhof were contesting to win their second title of the season together.

Inglot had won the tournament in 2018 with Franko Škugor, but Škugor did not return to defend his title and competed in Stuttgart instead.

Seeds

Draw

Draw

References

 Main Draw

Libéma Open - Men's Doubles
2019 Men's Doubles